An eau de vie (French for spirit) is a clear, colourless fruit brandy that is produced by means of fermentation and double distillation. The fruit flavor is typically very light.

In English-speaking countries, eau de vie refers to a distilled beverage made from fruit other than grapes. Similar terms may be local translations or may specify the fruit used to produce it. Although eau de vie is a French term, similar beverages are produced in other countries (e.g., German Schnaps, Greek ρακί, Turkish rakı, Balkan rakia, Romanian țuică, Czech and Slovak pálenka, Hungarian pálinka, and Sri Lankan coconut arrack). In French, however, eau de vie is a generic term for distilled spirits. The proper French term for fruit brandy is eau-de-vie de fruit, while eau-de-vie de vin means wine spirit (brandy), and several further categories of spirits (distilled from grape pomace, lees of wine, beer, cereals, etc.) are also legally defined as eau-de-vie in a similar fashion. Many eaux de vie made from fruits, wine, pomace, or rye have a protected designation of origin within the European Union.

Production

Fruit spirit

Traditional fruit spirit is made with ripe fruit that is fermented, distilled, and quickly bottled to preserve the freshness and aroma of the parent fruit. Eaux de vie are typically not aged in wooden casks, hence they are clear.  Although this is the usual practice, some distillers age their products before bottling.

Geist

Some fruits, such as raspberries, rowanberries, rosehips, and sloes, do not contain adequate sugars for fermenting. Instead, the spirits are produced by macerating fruit in neutral grain spirits for some time before distilling. The legal term used for these spirits within the European Union is Geist, meaning "spirit" in German. Geist can also be produced with vegetables, nuts, herbs, and other plant materials such as rose petals, mushrooms or pumpkin seeds.

Varieties 
Most commonly available flavors in France are eau de vie de poire (pear, known as eau de vie de Poire Williams when made from the Williams pear), Eau de vie de framboise (raspberries), eau de vie de pomme (apple), eau de vie de mirabelle (Mirabelle plum), and eau de vie de pêche (peach). When made from pomace, it is called pomace brandy or marc. 
 
While most eaux de vie from the Alpine regions of Europe only rest very briefly in glass containers, others are aged in wooden casks before bottling. Thus, calvados, an apple-based spirit from northwestern France, is required by law to spend at least two years in wood, and most producers also offer much older products to the market (up to 20 years or more). Some slivovitz are also aged in wooden casks, giving them their golden or amber color and some additional flavors. Romanian țuică bătrână is aged in casks made from mulberry wood, which impart a pale brown color.

In the Caribbean, eaux-de-vie are made from tropical fruits such as banana, ambarella, guava, mango, pineapple, and sapodilla.

The term can also refer to maple eau de vie, made from maple syrup.

Acerum is a Canadian eau de vie made in Quebec from maple syrup.

Serving

An eau de vie is usually served as a digestif.

Sometimes, also is used in traditional recipes of the French cuisine, for deglazing, instead ofor together withthe usual white wine.

Eaux de vie should be served cold.

See also 

 Akvavit
 Aqua vitae
 Aguardiente
 Brandy
 Chacha
 Damassine
 Grappa
 Kirsch
 Liquor
 Orujo
 Pálinka
 Rakia
 Schnapps
 St. George Spirits, an American producer of eau de vie
 Williamine

Explanatory notes

References

External links

 Buying guide from Food & Wine

Fruit brandies